Knut Tøraasen (26 October 1938 – 18 November 2013) was a Norwegian civil servant and diplomat.

He held the mag.art. degree and was hired in the Ministry of Foreign Affairs in 1967. He served as Norway's ambassador to Nigeria from 1992 to 1995, as well as Latvia from 1995 to 1999 before becoming a special adviser in the Ministry of Foreign Affairs. He lastly served as Norway's ambassador to Croatia from 2001 to 2005.

References

1938 births
2013 deaths
Norwegian civil servants
Ambassadors of Norway to Nigeria
Ambassadors of Norway to Latvia
Ambassadors of Norway to Croatia